Timocratica albella is a moth in the family Depressariidae. It was described by Philipp Christoph Zeller in 1839. It is found in Suriname.

The wingspan is about 17 mm.

References

Moths described in 1839
Timocratica